Four ships of the Royal Navy have been named HMS Formidable with a fifth, the French Formidable, renamed HMS Ham after being captured and recommissioned; a sixth has been announced:

 HMS Ham (1759) was the 80-gun second rate  captured from the French at the Battle of Quiberon Bay in 1759. Broken up in 1768.
  was a 90-gun second rate launched in 1777. She fought at the Battle of Ushant and the Battle of the Saintes, was converted to a 74-gun third rate in 1813, and broken up later that year. 
  was an 84-gun second rate launched in 1825. She was lent as a training ship in 1869 and was sold in 1906.
  was a  predreadnought battleship launched in 1898 and torpedoed and sunk in 1915.
  was an  launched in 1939 and sold for scrap in 1953.
 HMS Formidable will be a Type 31 frigate.

Battle honours
Ships named Formidable have earned the following battle honours:
The Saints 1782
Matapan 1941
Crete 1941
Mediterranean 1941
North Africa 1942–43
Sicily 1943
Salerno 1943
Norway 1944
Okinawa 1945
Japan 1945

See also 
 
 , a former French ship named Formidable.

Royal Navy ship names